Rudy Héctor Pemberton Pérez (born December 17, 1969) is a former professional baseball outfielder. He played parts of three seasons in Major League Baseball, from  through , for the Detroit Tigers (1995) and Boston Red Sox (1996–1997), playing mainly as a right fielder. Listed at 6' 1", 185 lb., he batted and threw right-handed.

Pemberton spent six years in the Tigers minor league system before joining the big team in 1995, hitting  for a .300 batting average (9-for-30) in 12 games. He entered the baseball record books with the 1996 Red Sox, after recording 21 hits in 41 at-bats for a .512 batting average, to collect the highest batting average for any player who had 30 or more at-bats in a major league season.

In a three-season career, Pemberton was a .336 hitter (45-for-134) with three home runs and 23 RBI in 52 games, including 22 runs, 13 doubles, one triple and three stolen bases.

Following his major league career, Pemberton played with the Oklahoma City 89ers (1996), Pawtucket Red Sox (1996), Birmingham Barons (1999) and Memphis Redbirds (1999), being named the Triple-A All-Star outfielder during the 1996 season. He also played in the Mexican League in 2000–03 and 2005. In 11 minor league seasons he hit .336 with 113 home runs with 509 RBI in 930 games.

External links

Capitol Punisment

1969 births
Living people
Memphis Redbirds players
Birmingham Barons players
Boston Red Sox players
Bristol Tigers players
Detroit Tigers players
Dominican Republic expatriate baseball players in Canada
Dominican Republic expatriate baseball players in Japan
Dominican Republic expatriate baseball players in South Korea
Dominican Republic expatriate baseball players in the United States
Fayetteville Generals players
Kia Tigers players
Lakeland Tigers players

London Tigers players
Major League Baseball outfielders
Major League Baseball players from the Dominican Republic
Oklahoma City 89ers players
Pawtucket Red Sox players
Toledo Mud Hens players
Seibu Lions players
Dominican Republic expatriate baseball players in Mexico
Dominican Republic expatriate baseball players in Taiwan
Acereros de Monclova players
Diablos Rojos del México players
Langosteros de Cancún players
Macoto Cobras players
Vaqueros Laguna players